Saša Todić (born 26 March 1974) is a Serbian former footballer who played as a goalkeeper.

Career
Todić made a name for himself at Proleter Zrenjanin (1993–2000) and Vojvodina (2000–2005), collecting over 100 appearances for each side in the top division. He later went on to play for two Ukrainian clubs, Tavriya Simferopol in the top flight (2006–2008) and Krymteplytsia Molodizhne in the second division (2009). In the 2010–11 season, Todić made eight appearances for Novi Sad in the second tier, while also serving as assistant manager to Zoran Govedarica. He later worked as a goalkeeping coach for his former club Vojvodina and the Thailand national football team.

References

External links
 
 
 

Association football goalkeepers
Expatriate footballers in Ukraine
FC Krymteplytsia Molodizhne players
First League of Serbia and Montenegro players
FK Jastrebac Niš players
FK Proleter Zrenjanin players
FK Vojvodina players
RFK Novi Sad 1921 players
SC Tavriya Simferopol players
Second League of Serbia and Montenegro players
Serbia and Montenegro footballers
Serbian expatriate footballers
Serbian expatriate sportspeople in Ukraine
Serbian First League players
Serbian footballers
Sportspeople from Zrenjanin
Ukrainian First League players
Ukrainian Premier League players
1974 births
Living people